Ciulinii Bărăganului (The Thistles of the Bărăgan) is a 1958 Franco-Romanian film directed by Louis Daquin and Gheorghe Vitanidis, based on a novel of the same title by Panait Istrati.

The film was nominated for the Golden Palm award at the 1958 Cannes Film Festival.

Cast
 Nuța Chirlea, as Matache
 Ana Vlădescu, as Tudorița
 Ruxandra Ionescu, as Stana
 Florin Piersic, as Tănase
 , as Mărin
 , as Dudaca
 Matei Alexandru, as Ursu
 Marcel Anghelescu
 Maria Tănase
 
 Ernest Maftei
 Benedict Dabija

References

External links
 

1958 films
Films based on Romanian novels
French historical drama films
Romanian historical drama films
1950s Romanian-language films
Romania in fiction
Films directed by Louis Daquin
Films directed by Gheorghe Vitanidis
1950s French films
1950s historical drama films